Wuttikrai Pathan (born 9 January 1995) is a Thai professional footballer who plays as a defensive midfielder for Thai League club Trat.

References

External links

1995 births
Living people
Wuttikrai Pathan
Wuttikrai Pathan
Association football midfielders
Wuttikrai Pathan
Wuttikrai Pathan
Thai expatriate sportspeople in South Korea